Wiesław Woda (17 August 1946 – 10 April 2010) was a Polish politician.

Woda was born in Paleśnica.  He was elected to the Sejm on 25 September 2005, getting 8,818 votes in 15 Tarnów district as a candidate for Polish People's Party.

He was also a member of People's Republic of Poland Sejm 1989-1991, Sejm 1997-2001, and Sejm 2001-2005.

He was listed on the flight manifest of the Tupolev Tu-154 of the 36th Special Aviation Regiment carrying the President of Poland Lech Kaczyński which crashed near Smolensk-North airport near Pechersk near Smolensk, Russia, on 10 April 2010, killing all aboard.

On 16 April 2010 Woda was posthumously awarded the Commander's Cross of the Order of Polonia Restituta. His funeral took place on 25 April 2010. There was a Mass at St Mary's Church in Kraków, concelebrated by Cardinal Stanislaw Dziwisz. Wieslaw Woda was buried in the Alley of the Meritorious in Rakowicki Cemetery in Kraków next to Adam Studziński.

See also
Members of Polish Sejm 2005-2007

References

External links
 Wiesław Woda - parliamentary page - includes declarations of interest, voting record, and transcripts of speeches.

Members of the Polish Sejm 2005–2007
Members of the Polish Sejm 1997–2001
Members of the Polish Sejm 2001–2005
Polish People's Party politicians
1946 births
2010 deaths
People from Tarnów County
Victims of the Smolensk air disaster
Commanders of the Order of Polonia Restituta
Members of the Polish Sejm 2007–2011